is a passenger railway station located in the city of Seiyo, Ehime Prefecture, Japan. It is operated by JR Shikoku and has the station number "U18".

Lines
Connections with other services are needed to travel further east of Matsuyama on the line.

In addition, the Uwakai limited express also stops at the station.

Layout
The station consists of an island platform and a side platform serving three tracks. Access to the island platform is by means of a footbridge. A timber station building of traditional Japanese design houses a waiting room, a shops and a JR ticket window (with a Midori no Madoguchi facility). Car parking is available outside the station. A siding branches off line 1 and ends near the station building.

Adjacent stations

History
Unomachi then became part of the Yosan Main Line on 20 June 1945. At that time, the station was operated by Japanese Government Railways (JGR), later becoming Japanese National Railways (JNR). With the privatization of JNR on 1 April 1987, control of the station passed to JR Shikoku.

Surrounding area 
 Museum of Ehime History and Culture
 Kaimei School

See also
 List of railway stations in Japan

References

External links
Station timetable

External links
Unomachi Station (JR Shikoku)

Railway stations in Ehime Prefecture
Railway stations in Japan opened in 1941
Seiyo, Ehime